Jozsef Maria Julius Simon de Revay, Count Sklabina and Blatnicka, (20 October 1902 – 19 April 1945) was a Hungarian philosopher, professor, and ice hockey player. He played for the Hungarian national team at the 1928 and 1936 Winter Olympics and at the World Championships.  He later taught at Pázmány Péter Catholic University.

World War II
Following the forming of Communist government in Hungary towards end of World War II, he was arrested by police, interrogated and eventually killed.

References

External links
 

1902 births
1945 deaths
Academic staff of Pázmány Péter Catholic University
Hungarian ice hockey centres
Ice hockey players at the 1928 Winter Olympics
Olympic ice hockey players of Hungary
People from Nitra District
Sportspeople from the Nitra Region
20th-century Hungarian philosophers
20th-century executions by Hungary